Events from the year 1791 in art.

Events
The Society of Artists of Great Britain is dissolved.

Works

James Barry – The Thames (or Triumph of Navigation)
Henri-Pierre Danloux – Baron de Besenval in his Study (National Gallery, London)
Anne-Louis Girodet de Roussy-Trioson – Endymion: Moonlight (The Sleep of Endymion)
Anton Graff – Friedrich Schiller
George Morland
The Inside of a Stable
The Slave Trade
Jean-Laurent Mosnier – Portrait of the Chevalier d'Eon
Henry Raeburn – Portrait of Sir John and Lady Clerk of Penicuik
George Stubbs – Equestrian portrait of The Prince of Wales

Births
January 6 – William Bent Berczy, painter and political figure in Upper Canada (died 1873)
February 10
Francesco Hayez, Italian historical, portrait and political painter (died 1881)
Ōtagaki Rengetsu, Japanese Buddhist nun and poet, skilled potter and painter, and expert calligrapher (died 1875)
February 13 – Sylvester Shchedrin, Russian landscape painter (died 1830)
February 21 – Hezekiah Augur, American sculptor and inventor (died 1858)
March 20 – Marie Ellenrieder, German painter (died 1863)
April 27 – Samuel F. B. Morse, American inventor and painter of portraits and historic scenes (died 1872)
June 18 – William Cowen, English landscape painter (died 1864)
August 2 – August Piepenhagen, German painter active in Bohemia (died 1868)
September 26 – Théodore Géricault, French painter and lithographer, pioneer of the Romantic movement (died 1824)
December 17 – Samuel Amsler, Swiss engraver (died 1849)
date unknown
Kapiton Pavlov, Russian portrait painter (died 1852)
Pyotr Sokolov, Russian aquarelle portraitist (died 1848)
Antoine Jean-Baptiste Thomas, French painter and lithographer (died 1833)

Deaths
January 4 – Étienne Maurice Falconet, French Rococo sculptor (born 1716)
January 23 – François-Thomas Germain, French silversmith (born 1726)
January 25 – Giovanni Pichler, German-Italian artist in engraved gems (born 1734)
February 12 – William Parry, Welsh portrait painter (born 1743)
March 20 – Marie Jeanne Clemens, Danish engraver and painter, member of Danish Academy of Fine Arts (born 1755)
June 5 – Giuseppe Ghedini, Italian painter and university professor of painting (born 1708)
June 22 – Giuseppe Antonio Landi, Italian neoclassical architect and painter of quadratura (born 1713)
June 30 – Jean-Baptiste Descamps, French painter of village scenes (born 1714)
October 17 – Per Floding, Swedish designer and engraver (born 1731)
November 7 – Dorning Rasbotham, English writer and painter (born 1730)
November 16 – Edward Penny, English portrait and historical painter (born 1714)
November 25 – Jean-Claude Richard, French painter and engraver (born 1727)
date unknown
Robert Carver, Irish painter, especially of theater scenery (born 1730)
Gang Se-hwang, Korean politician, painter, calligrapher and art critic (born 1713)

References

 
Years of the 18th century in art
1790s in art